Tsing Fai Tong is a village in Tsuen Wan District, Hong Kong.

Administration
Tsing Fai Tong is a recognized village under the New Territories Small House Policy.

See also
 Tin Fu Tsai

References

External links

 Delineation of area of existing village Tsing Fai Tong (Tsuen Wan) for election of resident representative (2019 to 2022)

Villages in Tsuen Wan District, Hong Kong